Aggro Berlin is the fourth studio album by German rapper Sido. It was released on 30 October 2009 via Urban (Universal).

Track listing

Charts

Weekly charts

Year-end charts

References

2009 albums
German-language albums
Sido (rapper) albums